Garcitas Creek is a  stream in Victoria County and Jackson County, Texas, in the United States. It flows to Garcitas Cove.

Garcitas is a name derived from Spanish meaning the fresh antlers of a deer.

References

External links
 

Rivers of Jackson County, Texas
Rivers of Victoria County, Texas
Rivers of Texas